Stefano Moscatelli (died 1485) was a Roman Catholic prelate who served as Bishop of Nusco (1471–1485).

Biography
On 11 Oct 1471, Stefano Moscatelli was appointed by Pope Sixtus IV as Bishop of Nusco.
He served as Bishop of Nusco until his death in 1485.

References

External links and additional sources
 (for Chronology of Bishops) 
 (for Chronology of Bishops) 

15th-century Italian Roman Catholic bishops
1485 deaths
Bishops appointed by Pope Sixtus IV